Oleg Vladimirovich Dmitriyev (born 31 March 1973) is a Russian former professional footballer.

Club career
He made his professional debut in the Soviet First League in 1990 for FC Zenit Leningrad.

Post-playing career
After his retirement he works as a firefighter.

Honours
 Russian Cup winner: 1999 (played in the early stages of the 1998/99 tournament for FC Zenit St. Petersburg).

References

1973 births
Footballers from Saint Petersburg
Living people
Soviet footballers
Russian footballers
Russia under-21 international footballers
Association football midfielders
FC Zenit Saint Petersburg players
FC Rubin Kazan players
FC Dynamo Saint Petersburg players
FC Metallurg Lipetsk players
FC Petrotrest players
Russian Premier League players
Russian firefighters
FC Zenit-2 Saint Petersburg players